White Lake is the name of several lakes in the U.S. state of Michigan. The largest one is formed by the White River flowing to its mouth on Lake Michigan in Muskegon County.

Muskegon County 

The largest White Lake is in Muskegon County, Michigan, formed by the White River near its mouth on Lake Michigan. The city of Montague,  Montague Township and White River Township are on the north side of the lake. The city of Whitehall, Whitehall Township, and Fruitland Township are on the south side of the lake.

The lake takes its name from the white clay that long formed around its banks, which in the 18th and 19th centuries was used for washing by the lake's Ottawa residents. The Ottawa called the lake Waabigankiishkbogong, meaning "The Place of White Clay."

Others 
Other smaller lakes are located in the following counties:

Other White Lakes are in 

See also 
 White Lake Township, Michigan in Oakland County
 White Lake (disambiguation)
 List of lakes in Michigan

References

External links 
 

Lakes of Michigan
Lakes of Muskegon County, Michigan